Rybalko is a rural locality (a selo) in Krasnoarmeysky Selsoviet, Kizlyarsky District, Republic of Dagestan, Russia. The population was 1,787 as of 2010. There are 14 streets.

Geography 
Rybalko is located 13 km southwest of Kizlyar (the district's administrative centre) by road. Zarechnoye and Borozdinovskoye are the nearest rural localities.

Nationalities 
Avars, Rutuls, Laks, Lezgins, Dargins, Russians and Tabasarans live there.

References 

Rural localities in Kizlyarsky District